The Metropolitan is a condominium building at 20 Marietta Street NW at the southeast corner of Broad Street in the Five Points district of Downtown Atlanta. It was built in 1908 as the Third National Bank Building And is Atlanta's first skyscraper. It was later the Atlanta Federal Savings and Loan Building, and in the 1960s was resurfaced with dark glass. It was converted into condominiums in 1996.

Gallery

External links
"Third National Bank Building", Atlanta History Center
Atlanta Time Machine, postcard circa 1960 of Atlanta Federal S&L Building

References

Residential skyscrapers in Atlanta
Residential condominiums in the United States
Office buildings completed in 1911
Morgan & Dillon buildings